is located on the borders of Gifu and Fukui prefectures in Japan. It is part of the Ryōhaku Mountains and serves as the drainage divide between the Pacific Ocean and the Japan Sea. There is one triangulation station at the top of the mountain.

Fragaria iinumae was discovered at first in this Mountain and the name  was given.

History 
 718: Mountain first climbed by Taichō.
 1965: A large landslide was created by a major flood in the fall.

Gallery

See also 

 Ryōhaku Mountains
 Fragaria iinumae

References

Mountains of Gifu Prefecture
Mountains of Fukui Prefecture